"Over in the Meadow" is a popular counting rhyme written by Olive A. Wadsworth (pen name of Katherine Floyd Dana) in 1870.  Many variations on the original wording exist.  It has also been set to music, and has been used as the text of numerous picture books.

References

Children's songs